Nguyễn Văn Chiếu (4 November 1949 – 4 February 2020), baptismal name Peter) was a Vietnamese grand master of martial arts. He was the Chief of Vovinam Council from 27 September 2015 until his death.

Biography
Nguyễn Văn Chiếu was born on 4 November 1949 in Saigon, Vietnam.

His father was Nguyễn Văn Ba (1926-2014).

Nguyễn Văn Chiếu started practicing Vovinam under the guidance of master Lê Sáng in 1965, when he was 16 years old. In 1967, after three years of hard practice, he earned his 3-dan black belt.

In 1969, he started to teach Vovinam at Quy Nhơn city in Bình Định province. Bình Định is the homeland of traditional martial arts of Vietnam. Because many masters in Bình Định supported him, after five years, Nguyễn Văn Chiếu opened twelve dojos. He trained many students such as future masters Đinh Văn Hòa, Trương Quang Bính, Đỗ Thị Ngọc Long, and Nguyễn Thị Lạc.

In 1975, he left Quy Nhơn and returned to Saigon. He worked as a staff of sport department in District 8 of Saigon.

From 1975 to 1988, his teacher, master Lê Sáng was held in a re-education camp by the new government in Saigon.

At the end of 1976, he tried to persuade the local government to allow him to teach Vovinam.

On 4 February 2020, he died in Ho Chi Minh City, Vietnam.

Family

Nguyễn Văn Chiếu was married and had one son and one daughter. His son is Nguyễn Bình Định (b. 1982) and is a 3-dan yellow belt in Vovinam who works in Department of Sports of Ho Chi Minh City as of 2011. His daughter is Thanh Nhã Berrier (née Nguyễn). She is a French national and is married to fellow Frenchman Francois Berrier.

References

1949 births
2020 deaths
Vietnamese male martial artists